The Original Braunvieh is a dual purpose dairy and beef breed from the Switzerland. Braunvieh means "brown cow" and the animals are coloured grey to brown with white ears and muzzle and have horns. These cattle have been maintained as a pure breed, while the modern Swiss Braunvieh have been crossed with Brown Swiss. They have contributed to the American Brown Swiss breed. In the 1980s breeding associations were formed in Germany and Austria to conserve the breed.

Characteristics

The most fundamental differences between Original Braunvieh and Braunvieh are lower height, lower milk yield, larger muscles and the better beef performance.

History
Monks at the Monastery of Einsliedein bred the cattle for several centuries, keeping records showing the breeding principles and early Braunvieh breeding philosophy. The monks kept detailed records and diaries of their breeding principles. Braunvieh cattle exported from Switzerland to the United States between 1869 and 1880 were selected for milk production and formed the basis of the American Brown Swiss breed.

References

Cattle breeds
Cattle breeds originating in Switzerland
Animal breeds on the GEH Red List